Igunaq ), also Kopalhen (IPA [kopaɬɣən]) - part of the Inuit, Chukchi, Nenets, Evenki diets. It is a method of preparing meat, particularly walrus and other marine mammals.  Meat and fat caught in the summer is buried in the ground as steaks, which then ferment over autumn and freeze over winter, ready for consumption the next year. Igunaq is considered a delicacy and is quite valuable. Consumption has declined over the years as a wider range of foodstuffs has become available in the Arctic regions. It is also not without risk – improper production can lead to illness and death through botulism.

Fermented fish and fermented food is part of many traditional cuisines worldwide.

References

Inuit cuisine
Animal-based fermented foods
Meat